Lilija is a Latvian and Lithuanian feminine given name. The associated name day is April 30.

Notable people named Lilija
Lilija Dinere (born 1955), Latvian painter and illustrator
Lilija Eugenija Jasiūnaitė (born 1944), Lithuanian painter and textile artist

References 

Latvian feminine given names
Lithuanian feminine given names
Feminine given names